Kamna Gorica is a village in the Municipality of Radovljica in the Upper Carniola region of Slovenia.

Church

The local church, dedicated to the Holy Trinity, was built in 1652 and enlarged in 1754. It has two altar paintings by Matevž Langus.

Notable people
Notable people that were born or lived in Kamna Gorica include:
Karl Josef Kappus (born 1668), lawyer, member of Academia operosorum Labacensium
Johannes Andreas Kappus (c. 1648–1713), Jesuit
Marcus Antonius Kappus (1657–1717), missionary
Vladimir Kapus (1885–1943), journalist, writer
 (1808–1879), journalist, writer, poet
 (1792–1855), painter
Franc Megušar (1876–1916), zoologist
 (1880–1919), politician
 (1912–1988), scales technician, precision mechanic, inventor, innovator, engraver
Aleksander Toman (1851–1931), agronomist, journalist
Lovro Toman (1827–1870), politician
Blaž Tomaževič (1909–1986), literary historian, teacher
Jožef Tomažovič Sr. (1774–1847), musician, teacher
 (1784–1860), national awakener, priest
Ivan Varl (1923–1979), painter
 (1853–1915), pipe organ builder

References

External links 

Kamna Gorica at Geopedia
Kamna Gorica official web page

Populated places in the Municipality of Radovljica